Tara Deodhar (born 1924) is a badminton and tennis player from India. She is the daughter of India's cricket legend D. B. Deodhar.

Education
In 1946, Deodhar studied at the University of Wisconsin.

Career
Tara Deodhar won her first national title in 1942 in the women's doubles with her sister Sunder Deodhar.  Between 1942 and 1954 the Deodhar sisters, Suman, Sunder, and Tara dominated the Indian National Badminton Champion competition.

She was also a strong tennis player.  While studying at University of Wisconsin-Madison, she was seeded fifth among foreign tennis players in the U.S. Tennis Championship.

References

Indian female badminton players
Indian national badminton champions
Possibly living people
Marathi people
Sportswomen from Maharashtra
Racket sportspeople from Maharashtra
Indian female tennis players
20th-century Indian women
20th-century Indian people
1924 births
Indian expatriates in the United States
University of Wisconsin–Madison alumni